Sevmek Ve Ölmek Zamanı is a 1971 Turkish romance film, directed by Halit Refiğ and starring Türkan Soray, Murat Soydan, and Zuhal Aktan.

References

External links
Sevmek Ve Ölmek Zamanı at the Internet Movie Database

1971 films
Turkish romance films
1970s romance films
Films directed by Halit Refiğ
1970s Turkish-language films